The Circus Cavalcade is a 1945 Argentine musical film directed and written by Mario Soffici with Eduardo Boneo and Francisco Madrid. The film was shot on black-and-white stock with a monaural soundtrack.  It stars Libertad Lamarque and Hugo del Carril.

In 2022, it was selected as the 52nd greatest film of Argentine cinema in a poll organized by the specialized magazines La vida útil, Taipei and La tierra quema, which was presented at the Mar del Plata International Film Festival.

Plot Outline
The lives, loves and vicissitudes of a group of circus performers in the Argentine Pampas around the turn of the century are played out in this drama with songs.

Cast
Libertad Lamarque ....  Nita
Hugo del Carril ....  Roberto
José Olarra
Orestes Caviglia
Juan José Miguez
Armando Bo
Ilde Pirovano
Tino Tori
Elvira Quiroga
Eva Perón  (as Eva Duarte)
Ricardo Castro Ríos
Ana Nieves
Carlos Rivas

References

External links
 

Tango films
1945 films
Argentine musical films
1940s Spanish-language films
1945 musical films
Films directed by Mario Soffici
Argentine black-and-white films
1940s Argentine films